Lunar Jim is a Canadian animated science-fiction stop-motion television series that aired from January 2, 2006 to April 24, 2012. The series centered around Lunar Jim, an astronaut on the blue moon L22.

The series, produced by Halifax Film Company and Alliance Atlantis in association with CBC Television, Radio-Canada and BBC Kids, was based on an original concept created by Alexander Bar. Benny Zelkowicz was the director and he voiced Jim in the series.

Premise
Jim and his team – Rover the Robot Dog, Ripple the Super Space Mechanic, Eco the Farmer, and T.E.D the Technical Equipment Device – live on Blue Moon L22, the second-to-last moon on the edge of the Milky Way. Focusing on exploration and inquiry, Lunar Jim intends to promote such life skills as problem-solving, persistence, creativity, and cooperation, with an emphasis on "pre-science skills". His catch phrase is "Let's get lunar!"

The first series features only the main 5 characters (6, if counting Pixel) as they explored the moon, and they are depicted as the only people of the time to live on a moon. Series 2 established that they are part of a larger network of moon-dwelling astronauts, and introduced 3 new recurring characters.

Characters

Main
 Lunar Jim (Benny Zelkowicz), the show's main protagonist. He is an adventure and mystery-loving character, and is curious about his surroundings.
 Rover, a robot dog,  is always by Jim's side. Rover loves to play fetch and always helps Jim on his lunar missions. He speaks only in beeps, and  Jim and T.E.D are the only ones who can understand him.
 Ripple (Gil Anderson), the engineer on the moon. She is always coming up with new inventions to help Jim and often helps him on his missions. She drives the Scooter.
 Eco (Jim Fowler), the farmer on the moon who works in the Eco dome growing plants and raising the animals. Eco loves to collect rocks and plants to study and help Jim. He doesn't often go on missions because he is far too busy farming in the Eco dome. He usually drives the Hopper.
 T.E.D (Technical Equipment Device) (John Davie), a humanoid robot. He is the clumsiest on the moon and his clumsiness creates some simple slapstick comedy. He is somewhat paranoid, being afraid of many non-existent things. However, he is quite smart and sometimes solves the problem in the story, though much of his main plot elements involve him being extremely arrogant. T.E.D represents a child and essentially, the show's target audience.
 Pixel (Kristin Bell), the computer that helps Jim and his friends find things on the lunar surface and tells them their jobs for the day.
 Daisy, a cow. Lunar Jim and his team get their milk from Daisy.
 Delores, a chicken who provides eggs for the team.

In the second series, three additional characters were added to the series:
 Skye, a young trainee astronaut who comes to Moona Luna for "hands-on" training.
 Yik Yak, a turtle-like alien who speaks in rhyme. He visits Jim and his friends often, but his visits usually result in some sort of unintentional problem. Although he only speaks in Series 2, he does make a cameo in the first series.
 Zippity, A space mailman who sounds like a robot, but is never described as such.

Supporting
In the television series, there are minor characters who make an appearance, and cause some trouble.
 Colby the Collector – Used to collect objects on the moon to study. He was sent to the moon before Lunar Jim. He makes more than one appearance.
 The Garden-bot – Built by Ripple to help Eco garden, but malfunctions and destroys all the plants.
 The Lunar worm – A worm that lives in a compost crater who eats the peels of fruits and jupiterbugs.
 The Fluffies– A small species of animals on the moon who reproduce on the double. They are sometimes seen in the background of a few episodes.

Setting

Blue Moon L22
Blue Moon L22 is the moon where the series takes place. For the show, the moon is divided into sectors (e.g. sector "L" or sector "12"). Each sector also contains certain locations like "The Crystal Caves" or "The Chime Flower Meadow". Lunar Jim usually explores these sectors in each episode, and is always finding new ones.

Moona Luna
Moona Luna is the small settlement where Jim and his friends live. The settlement includes the Eco dome, Mission control, Jim's home, Ripple's home (never mentioned) and a windmill which is also never mentioned. Mission control is the building where Jim "gets lunar" and where all the vehicles are stored. The Eco dome is a lunar greenhouse.

This is the place where Eco is usually found farming and taking care of the livestock Daisy and Dolores. Jim's home is where he and Rover live and is usually the place where each episode begins. In Season Two, the Moonport, which is a spaceship landing, refueling and repair port, is built, although few other spaceships visit. The places where T.E.D or Eco live are never mentioned. In many episodes it has been mentioned that there are other colonies of astronauts on the moon, but they're never seen in person.

Vehicles
When Jim "gets lunar", he chooses one of the following vehicles for his mission:
 Lunar Lifter – A hovering vehicle. Its main use is using the built-in winch on the bottom.
 Lunar Crawler – A simple backhoe on tracks. The vehicle's arm can be fully customizable with a selection of attachments that can be chosen for a mission, and once had a voice control unit.
 Lunar Hopper – The only wheeled vehicle on the moon at the cost of being the slowest. It comes with a trailer and a winch.
 Lunar Scrambler – The fastest vehicle on the moon. It resembles a scooter and is small and sleek for getting to a mission fast.
 Lunar Scooter – Similar to the Scrambler, only it has a winch at the bottom and is only used by Ripple when she accompanies Jim on a mission.

Production
The first season was executive produced by Mike Thurmeier. It was script edited in this season by Peter Serafinowicz.

Episodes
The series aired as either a full 22-minute series with two segments in each episode, or as a single 11-minute episode with one segment.

Season 1 (2006)

Season 2 (2012)

Broadcast
The series jointly premiered in Canada and Latin America on January 2, 2006, on CBC Television and Discovery Kids Latin America, respectively.

Other broadcasters who premiered/acquired the series at the time included the ABC TV in Australia on March 14, CBeebies in the United Kingdom on April 3 (Which was redubbed with British English voice actors), KiKA in Germany on April 13 (with ZDF premiering the series at a later date following KiKA), and CBC's Ici Radio-Canada Télé on April 15. Other broadcasters who acquired the series included France 5 in France, who planned to premiere the series within a Fall 2006 window.

The series was also broadcast on V-me in the United States, TG4 in Ireland, Cultura in Brazil, Canal Panda in Portugal, MiniMini in Poland, EBS in South Korea, NRK Super in Norway, Boomerang in Spain, ABC 4 Kids in Australia, Nickelodeon in the Netherlands and South Africa, and on eToonz Hop! Channel in Israel since 2007.

Home Media
On October 9, 2006, Alliance Atlantis appointed BBC Worldwide as the UK DVD license for the series. The show's first UK DVD release - "Let's Get Lunar", was released within that week, and contains 10 episodes.

References

External links
  
  Lunar Jim at the TV Cultura

CBC Television original programming
2006 Canadian television series debuts
2012 Canadian television series endings
2000s Canadian animated television series
2010s Canadian animated television series
2000s Canadian science fiction television series
2010s Canadian science fiction television series
2000s preschool education television series
2010s preschool education television series
Animated preschool education television series
Canadian children's animated science fantasy television series
Canadian preschool education television series
Canadian stop-motion animated television series
Television series by DHX Media
Television series by Alliance Atlantis
English-language television shows